

Root Medici Tree

Medici family tree (Grand Dukes of Tuscany)

Structure of the family tree lines

The descendants line

Origins

Branch of Salvestro di Averardo

Branch of Cafaggiolo

Branch of Popolano (Trebbio)/Grand Ducal Branch

Cornerstone figures of the line of succession

Places
 Medici villas
 Villa del Trebbio
 Villa di Castello
 Santi Severino e Sossio, Naples

See also

 History of Florence

References

External links
 
 

Family trees
History of Florence
History of Tuscany
Grand Duchy of Tuscany
People of the Republic of Florence